Thomas Mark Wilhelmsen (born December 16, 1983) is an American former professional baseball relief pitcher. He played in Major League Baseball (MLB) for the Seattle Mariners, Texas Rangers, and Arizona Diamondbacks.

Career
Wilhelmsen graduated from Tucson High School, whence he was selected by the Milwaukee Brewers in the seventh round (199th overall) of the 2002 MLB Draft. Later that summer, upon signing with the Brewers on August 19, he received a US $250,000 bonus. He began his professional career the next season.

Wilhelmsen played for the AZL Brewers and Beloit Snappers in 2003, going a combined 5-6 with a 2.84 ERA in 17 starts. Following that season, he twice tested positive for marijuana and was suspended for the 2004 campaign. He decided to quit professional baseball during extended spring training after his suspension ended in 2005.

During his five-year hiatus from 2005 to 2009, he worked as a bartender at The Hut, a tiki bar in his hometown. This occupation would later be the inspiration for his nickname.

Seattle Mariners
Prior to the 2010 season, Wilhelmsen attempted a comeback and signed a minor league contract with the Mariners. He played for the AZL Mariners, Everett AquaSox and Clinton LumberKings that season, going a combined 7-1 with a 2.19 ERA in 15 games (12 starts).

On May 17, 2011, after being signed by the Mariners he was optioned to Class AA in order to clear room for Franklin Gutierrez to be activated. After a series of trades created an opening on the Mariners' 25-man roster, Wilhelmsen was recalled from the minor leagues on August 2, 2011. He won his first major league game on August 15, pitching a perfect 8th inning against the Toronto Blue Jays.

On June 8, 2012, Wilhelmsen recorded the save in a six-pitcher combined no-hitter which was started by Kevin Millwood who left the game after the 6th inning due to a groin injury. The six pitchers used by the Mariners tied the record of most pitchers used in a no-hitter with the 2003 Houston Astros. The Mariners beat the Los Angeles Dodgers 1-0. Wilhelmsen said after the game that while he was pitching, he had forgotten it was a no-hitter, and only remembered after catcher Jesús Montero reminded him.

Wilhelmsen was optioned to Tacoma on August 6, 2013, and recalled in September. In 2014 Wilhelmsen was back in the Mariner bullpen, appearing in 57 games and finishing the season with a 2.27 ERA and a WHIP of  1.05. It was also in 2014 that Wilhelmsen reached a wider audience in baseball after his formidable dancing ability was captured on video.

During the 2015 season, Wilhelmsen had a brief stint on the disabled list after a bullpen accident; Wilhelmsen was swinging his arms when teammate Danny Farquhar ran into Wilhelmsen's right arm, resulting in a hyperextended elbow.

Texas Rangers
On November 16, 2015, the Mariners traded Wilhelmsen, James Jones, and a player to be named later (Patrick Kivlehan) to the Texas Rangers for Leonys Martín and Anthony Bass. On January 13, 2016, the Rangers and Wilhelmsen agreed to a one-year, $3.1 million contract to avoid arbitration. Wilhelmsen had a rough start with the Rangers with an ERA of 10.55. With this, the Rangers optioned Wilhelmsen to Triple A, but he refused, making him a free agent.

Second stint with Seattle
On June 22, 2016, Wilhelmsen signed a one-year contract with the Seattle Mariners. He was designated for assignment by the Mariners on November 18, and released on November 22.

Arizona Diamondbacks
Wilhelmsen signed a minor league contract with the Arizona Diamondbacks with an invitation to spring training in February 2017. He made the Diamondbacks' Opening Day roster. He was released on June 16, 2017 after struggling with his command, allowing 12 walks in 26 innings and posting a 4.44 ERA for the Diamondbacks.

Milwaukee Brewers
On June 20, 2017, Wilhelmsen signed a minor league contract with the Milwaukee Brewers. He was released on August 9, 2017.

San Diego Padres
On February 6, 2018, Wilhelmsen signed a minor league contract with the San Diego Padres. He was released on March 19.

St. Paul Saints
On May 2, 2018, Wilhelmsen signed with the St. Paul Saints of the independent American Association.

Toros de Tijuana
On July 3, 2018, Wilhelmsen signed with the Toros de Tijuana of the Mexican League. He was released on August 14, 2018.

Wilhelmsen announced his retirement on December 10, 2018.

Pitch mechanics
Wilhelmsen mainly throws two pitches — a four-seam fastball, which is usually 95-98 mph, and a 12-6 curveball, which will be in the upper 70s with a big, 12-6 break. He has experimented with a slider and circle changeup, but he uses these pitches sparingly. However, the changeup was seen more frequently during Spring Training in 2013.

References

External links

1983 births
Living people
Baseball players from Tucson, Arizona
Major League Baseball pitchers
American bartenders
Seattle Mariners players
Texas Rangers players
Arizona Diamondbacks players
Arizona League Brewers players
Beloit Snappers players
Tucson Toros players
Arizona League Mariners players
Everett AquaSox players
Clinton LumberKings players
Jackson Generals (Southern League) players
Tacoma Rainiers players
Peoria Javelinas players
Round Rock Express players
St. Paul Saints players
Tucson High School alumni